The 2011-12 IIHF European Women Champions Cup was the eighth playing of the IIHF European Women Champions Cup. Tornado Moscow Region of the Russian Women's Hockey League won the tournament for the second time in three seasons.

First round
The first round was contested in four host cities during 28 to 30 October 2011.

Group A
Group A was played in Bytom, Poland.

Standings

  ESC Planegg advanced to the second round.

Results

Group B
Group B was played in Miercurea Ciuc, Romania.

Standings

  Brûleurs de Loups de Grenoble advanced to the second round.

Results

Group C
Group C was played in Riga, Latvia.

Standings

  Herlev Hornets advanced to the second round.

Results

Group D
Group D was played in Spišská Nová Ves, Slovakia.

Standings

  EHV Sabres advanced to the second round.

Results

Second round
The second round was contested in two host cities, Hämeenlinna, Finland, and Dornbirn, Austria, during 2 to 4 December 2011.

Group E
Group E was played in Hämeenlinna, Finland.

Standings

  HPK advanced to the final tournament.
  ESC Planegg  advanced to the final tournament.

Group F
Group F was played in Dornbirn, Austria.

Standings

  HC Tornado advanced to the final tournament.
  ZSC Lions Frauen advanced to the final tournament.

Final round
The final round was contested from 24 to 26 February 2012 and was played in Hämeenlinna, Finland.

Statistics

Best Players selected by the directorate

References 
Tournament statistics and data from:
"2012 IIHF European Women Champions Cup: Tournament Reports". webarchive.iihf.com. International Ice Hockey Federation. Retrieved 12 November 2020.
"Coupe d'Europe féminine des clubs champions 2011/12". hockeyarchives.info (in French). Retrieved 12 November 2020.
”EWCC (W) - 2011-2012”. eliteprospects.com. Retrieved 12 November 2020.

External links
 International Ice Hockey Federation

Women
2010-11
Euro